"Do I Do" is a song written and performed by American singer and songwriter Stevie Wonder, first released in 1982 on the compilation album, Stevie Wonder's Original Musiquarium I (1982). The single peaked at #2 on the US Billboard soul chart and #13 on the Billboard Hot 100. On the Billboard dance chart, "Do I Do" went to number one for two weeks.  Overseas, it reached #10 in the UK.

Background
The album version of the song is ten and a half minutes long. It features a rare example of Wonder rapping near the end of the track. Dizzy Gillespie is also featured on the track with a trumpet solo. Both of these are omitted from the single edit of the song (some longer edits retain the Gillespie solo but omit the rapping). Wonder audibly counts down at the end of the track, which is not commonly heard at the end of musical singles. The song is noted by bassists for its intricate bassline, played by Nathan Watts. A commercial success, it was the recipient of three Grammy Award nominations including for Best Male R&B Vocal Performance and Best R&B Song. The song became the basis for Ja Rule’s "Livin it Up."

Personnel
Stevie Wonder - Lead vocals, piano, harmonica (uncredited in initial liner notes; credited in 2000 reissue), horn arrangements
Dizzy Gillespie - Trumpet
Nathan Lamar Watts - Bass
Dennis Davis - Drums
Earl DeRouen - Percussion
Rick Zunigar and Benjamin Bridges - Guitars
Isaiah Sanders - Fender Rhodes 
Windy Barnes, Melody McCullough, Shirley Brewer, and Alexandra Brown - Background vocals
Eugene Ghee, Janice Robinson, Britt Woodman, Virgil Jones, Anthony Tooley, Victor Paz, Clifton Anderson, Earl McIntyre, Frank Wess, Robert Rutledge, Lorenzo Wyche, J.D. Parran, Robert Eldridge, Alfred Wilson, Larry Gittens - Horns
Paul Riser - String arrangements

Charts

Weekly charts

Year-end charts

References

See also
 List of number-one dance singles of 1982 (U.S.)
 List of post-disco artists and songs

1982 singles
1981 songs
Stevie Wonder songs
Songs written by Stevie Wonder
Post-disco songs
Tamla Records singles
Song recordings produced by Stevie Wonder